are an Association football club from the Okinawa Prefecture, Japan. They will currently play on J3 League, the Japanese third tier of professional football.

The team derive their name from Ryukyu, the historic name for Okinawa Prefecture. The club once had futsal and handball teams.

History
The club was founded in 2003. Most of the players who initially joined the club were those who had left Okinawa Kariyushi FC after a rift with their management, which were beholden to the Kariyushi hotel chain. Their first 2003 season saw them win the championship in Okinawa Prefectural Division 3 North. They were allowed to skip to Division 1 the next season, where they again succeeded in finishing top of the table.

In the 2005 season, they belonged to the Kyūshū Regional League (Kyu League). After finishing 2nd and winning the Regional League play-off, they were promoted to the JFL and became the first ever Okinawan football side who played in a national league.

In December 2007, the club appointed former Japan national coach Philippe Troussier as their general manager. Jean-Paul Rabier was appointed as their manager in January 2008.

They applied for J. League Associate Membership in January 2008, but their application was declined at the J. League board meeting held on February 19, 2008.

In December 2008, the resignation of Rabier was announced. Former coach Hiroyuki Shinzato was promoted to be the new manager in January 2009.

In 2014, FC Ryukyu could finally join the J3 League.

In January 2015, FC Ryukyu announced a partnership with Seoul United from the Korean Challengers League. According to the agreement the teams will play a friendly match every year. The first match was scheduled for 1 March 2015.

FC Ryukyu have made steady progress in recent years, finishing in 8th place in J3 in 2016, and improving on that the following year, finishing 6th.

In the 2018 season they secured promotion to J2 with 3 games left after a 1–1 draw at Nagano Parceiro, and in the following game beat Thespakusatsu Gunma to claim the J3 title with two games to spare.

They started their first season in J2 in 2019, in style with 4 straight wins to top the league, but faded as the season progressed eventually finishing in 14th place.

In 2022, after spending four years in the J2 League, the club was relegated to J3 League for 2023 after their personal worst performance at the J2. The club finished at 21st place with 37 points, being only 3 points off the 22nd place team.

Home stadium
The home stadium is Tapic Prefecture Sohiyagon Stadium (Okinawa Prefectural Sports Park Athletic Stadium) based in Okinawa City.
Until 2014, the Okinawa City Athletic Stadium in Okinawa City was used as the main home stadium, and multiple stadiums were used.

League & cup record

Key

Honours
Japanese Regional Promotion Series:
Champions: 2005
J3 League:
Champions: 2018

Current squad
As of 17 March 2023.

Club officials
For the 2023 season.

Managerial history

Team colour and crest
Their team colour is bengara, a shade of red pigment. It is called red ochre in English and can be generally described as claret. Bengara derives from a Dutch word bengala which in turn derives from Bengal, a region in India and Bangladesh. This name was given because the pigment was traditionally imported from Bengal to Japan. Okinawa has a close association with the bengara colour which is prominently applied to Shuri Castle, one of the most symbolic historical buildings in the area.

In 2008 they adopted a sky-blue trim for their home uniform, as their bengara pigment pattern was considered too and similar to Aston Villa from England (the claret and sky-blue pattern was around long before Troussier and the French staff arrived, so a coincidence in colours is feasible). 

Their crest features a pair of Shisas, imaginary talismanic creatures in the area, and the crown of the kings of the former Ryukyu Kingdom.

Kit evolution

References

External links
  

 
Ryukyu
Ryukyu
Sports teams in Okinawa Prefecture
2003 establishments in Japan
Japan Football League clubs
J.League clubs